Juan Miguel de Agüero was a 16th-century Spanish architect from Santander  who participated in the design and construction of the Mexico City Metropolitan Cathedral, the Mérida Cathedral, and the fortifications of Havana, Cuba.

References

 
16th-century Spanish architects
Year of birth unknown
Year of death unknown
People from Santander, Spain